Adagio is the fifth album by American doom metal band Solitude Aeturnus.

Track listing
"My Endtime" – 0:48
"Days of Prayer" – 6:10
"Believe" – 5:52
"Never" – 2:53
"Idis" – 5:41
"Personal God" – 5:01
"Mental Pictures" – 4:57
"Insanity's Circles" – 6:05
"The Fall" – 2:28
"Lament" – 5:43
"Empty Faith" – 3:58
"Spiral Descent" – 7:09
"Heaven and Hell" – 6:13 (Black Sabbath cover)

Credits
Robert Lowe – vocals, guitars and bass on track 6 & 11
Edgar Rivera – guitars
John Perez – guitars, vocals on "The Fall"
Steve Moseley – bass, guitar solo on "Idis"
John Covington – drums

Production
Recorded at Rhythm Studios, Bidford On Avon, UK, April 1998
Produced by Solitude Aeturnus and Paul Johnston
Engineered by Paul Jonston
Mastered by Alexander Krull at Mastersound
Artwork and design by Travis Smith 
Photos by Jax Smith

References

Solitude Aeturnus albums
1998 albums
Massacre Records albums
Albums with cover art by Travis Smith (artist)